Ahmadpur  is an Assembly Constituency in Latur.

Previously it was in Nanded (Lok Sabha constituency).
After the delimitation commission, the Ahmadpur Assembly Constituency was attached to Latur.

Members of Legislative Assembly
1951: Nivarthireddy Namdeo Reddy, Indian National Congress
1995: Bhagwanrao Nagargoje, Bharatiya Janata Party
1999: Vinayakrao Kishanrao Jadhav Patil, Independent
2004: Babruwahan Khandade, BJP
2009: Babasaheb Mohanrao Patil, Rashtriya Samaj Paksha
2014: Vinayakrao Kishanrao Jadhav Patil, BJP
2019: Babasaheb Mohanrao Patil, Nationalist Congress Party

Election results

General elections 2009

General elections 2019

References
https://web.archive.org/web/20110815140153/http://electionaffairs.com/results/State_assembly/Maharashtra_2009/maharashtra_assembly_results_2009i.html

Assembly constituencies of Latur district
Latur
Assembly constituencies of Maharashtra